Alex James may refer to:

Alex James (musician) (born 1968), bassist in English band Blur, newspaper columnist and cheesemaker
Alex James (songwriter) (born 1976), songwriter, producer and music publisher
Alex James (footballer) (1901–1953), Scottish footballer with Arsenal F.C.
Alec James (cricketer) (1889–1961), Welsh cricketer
Alex James (mathematician), British and New Zealand mathematician and mathematical biologist
Alex James (professor), scientist and researcher 
Alex James (boxer), boxer from Grenada; see Boxing at the 1990 Central American and Caribbean Games